Boulenouar Wind Power Station, also Boulenoir Wind Power Station, is a   wind power plant, under development in Mauritania. When completed, as expected in 2022, the power station will be the largest wind power station in Mauritania.

Location
This is in the extreme northwest of the country, close to the international border with Western Sahara.

Overview
The wind farm consists of 39 Siemens-Gamesa turbines, each with rated capacity of 2.625 megawatts. The total installed capacity of the power station is 102.375 megawatts.

Development
The power station is owned by the consortium that is developing it and will operate it once construction is completed. The shareholders in the consortium are (a) the German  conglomerate Siemens and (b) the Spanish wind turbine manufacturer Siemens Gamesa. The Spanish technology conglomerate  Elecnor was part of the consortium but withdrew and sold its shareholding to Siemens, in the third quarter of 2020.

Costs and funding
As of September 2020, the development of this power station is budgeted at €140 million. The Arab Fund for Economic and Social Development (AFESD), a Kuwait-based development finance institution that is part of the Arab League, has committed to lend €120 million towards the development of this power station.

Impact
As of 2020, Mauritania uses approximately 380 megawatts of electricity. Of this, approximately 76 percent (approx. 289 MW), is sourced from thermal generators. The remaining 24 percent  (approx. 91 MW), is imported from Manantali Hydroelectric Power Station in Mali. With the country's population growling at 2.6 percent annually, renewable sources of energy, particularly solar and wind, offer an environmentally friendly pathway to expand its electricity supply and stimulate economic growth.

See also
List of power stations in Mauritania

References

External links
 Elecnor wins contract to build its second Wind Farm in Mauritania As of 3 July 2018.

Wind farms in Mauritania
Energy infrastructure in Mauritania